Agnes M. Brazal is a Filipina theologian, known for her work in feminist theology, a theology of migration, and cybertheology.

Biography 
Brazal received her first degree in 1981, a BS in management engineering from Ateneo de Manila University in Quezon City, Philippines. She later pursued studies in theology, first at Maryhill School of Theology in Quezon City, before completing a STL (1994) and a SThD (1998), both from the Katholieke Universiteit Leuven in Belgium.

She taught at Maryhill School of Theology (1998–2012), St. Vincent School of Theology (2012–2015), and, since 2016, has been at De la Salle University, where she is presently a full professor in theology and religious education. She was a founding member and past president of the Catholic Theological Society of the Philippines (DaKaTeo) and a founding member and past president of the Ecclesia of Women in Asia (EWA), an organization that encourages Catholic Asian female theologians to be heard as equal partners with male theologians.

Works

References 

Living people
World Christianity scholars
Filipino Roman Catholic theologians
Christian feminist theologians
Year of birth missing (living people)